Nils-Jonathan Körber (born 13 November 1996) is a German professional footballer who plays as a goalkeeper for  club Hansa Rostock.

Club career
In the summer of 2022, Körber signed a two-year contract with Hansa Rostock.

References

External links
Profile at FuPa.net

1996 births
Living people
Footballers from Berlin
German footballers
Germany youth international footballers
Germany under-21 international footballers
Association football goalkeepers
Hertha BSC II players
Hertha BSC players
SC Preußen Münster players
VfL Osnabrück players
FC Hansa Rostock players
Regionalliga players
3. Liga players
2. Bundesliga players